The 1977–78 Iraq FA Cup was the second edition of the Iraq FA Cup as a clubs-only competition. The tournament was won by Al-Tayaran (now known as Al-Quwa Al-Jawiya), beating Al-Shorta 5–3 on penalties in the final after a 1–1 draw for their first cup title.

Bracket

Matches

Final

References

External links
 Iraqi Football Website

Iraq FA Cup
Cup